Slaveyka Ruzhinska Nikolova (Славейка Ружинска Николова , born  in Kubrat) was a Bulgarian weightlifter, competing in the 69 kg category and representing Bulgaria at international competitions. 

She participated at the 2004 Summer Olympics in the 69 kg event. 
She competed at world championships, most recently at the 2007 World Weightlifting Championships.

Major results

References

External links

1983 births
Living people
Bulgarian female weightlifters
Weightlifters at the 2004 Summer Olympics
Olympic weightlifters of Bulgaria
People from Kubrat (town)
World Weightlifting Championships medalists
20th-century Bulgarian women
21st-century Bulgarian women